The Nagpur–Varanasi High Speed Rail Corridor is one of the six new proposed high-speed rail lines that will connect Maharashtra's eastern city Nagpur to Uttar Pradesh's Varanasi.

This line will link with the Delhi–Kolkata line, hence connecting Mumbai with the eastern India.

Possible stations
The stations are on the planned alignment as shown on National Rail Plan's (NRP) High-speed rail line map.

Project status

2021
December: Ministry of Railways had planned to propose four new high-speed rail corridors in India, including a 855 km corriodor from Nagpur to Varanasi.

See also
 High-speed rail in India
 Mumbai–Nagpur high-speed rail corridor
 Delhi–Varanasi high-speed rail corridor
 Varanasi–Howrah high-speed rail corridor
 Patna–Guwahati high-speed rail corridor

References

External links
 
 

N
Standard gauge railways in India
Rail transport in Maharashtra
Rail transport in Chhattisgarh
Rail transport in Madhya Pradesh
Rail transport in Uttar Pradesh
Proposed railway lines in India
India–Japan relations
2020 in rail transport
Transport in Nagpur
Transport in Varanasi